Frederick David Griffiths (8 March 191227 August 1994) was an English film and television actor. A former London cabbie and wartime fire fighter discovered by director Humphrey Jennings, and cast in his documentary film Fires Were Started in 1943; and over the next four decades played supporting roles and bit parts in 150 films, including various Ealing, Boulting Brothers and Carry On comedies, before eventually retiring in 1984.

Selected filmography

 Nine Men (1943) – Base Sergeant (uncredited)
 Fires Were Started (1943) – Johnny Daniels (uncredited)
 So Well Remembered (1947) – Mill Worker (uncredited)
 It Always Rains on Sunday (1947) – Sam
 Escape (1948) – Dart Player (uncredited)
 It's Hard to Be Good (1948) – Chauffeur (uncredited)
 Passport to Pimlico (1949) – Spiv
 The Huggetts Abroad (1949) – Taxi Driver (uncredited)
 Stop Press Girl (1949) – Truck Driver (uncredited)
 Golden Arrow (1949) – 2nd Military policeman
 Double Confession (1950) – The Spiv
 Pool of London (1951) – Sailor on Barge (uncredited)
 The Lavender Hill Mob (1951) – Taxi Driver (uncredited)
 Lady Godiva Rides Again (1951) – River Boat Guide (uncredited)
 The Woman's Angle (1952) – (Cockney), at end of 'bus stop)
 Judgment Deferred (1952) – Condemned Man (uncredited)
 I Believe in You (1952) – Crump
 Something Money Can't Buy (1952) - Customer at Fairground (uncredited)
 My Wife's Lodger (1952) – Driver
 The Cruel Sea (1953) – Gracey
 Street of Shadows (1953) – Cab Driver ( His voice was dubbed by uncredited person).
 Genevieve (1953) – Ice Cream Seller (uncredited)
 Turn the Key Softly (1953) – Newspaper Seller (uncredited)
 Wheel of Fate (1953)
 The Final Test (1953) – Taxi Driver (uncredited)
 A Day to Remember (1953) – Barman on Ferry (uncredited)
 Meet Mr. Lucifer (1953) – Removal Man
 The Million Pound Note (1954) – Serpentine Boatman (uncredited)
 Hell Below Zero (1954) – Drunken Sailor
 You Know What Sailors Are (1954) – 2nd Lorry Driver (uncredited)
 Bang! You're Dead (1954) – Milche
 Doctor in the House (1954) – Taxi Driver (uncredited)
 The Sleeping Tiger (1954) – Taxi Driver
 Carrington V.C. (1954) – Fred – 2nd Soldier in Naafi (uncredited)
 Companions in Crime (1954)
 One Good Turn (1955) – Shouting Boxing Spectator (uncredited)
 Raising a Riot (1955) – Bargee (uncredited)
 See How They Run (1955) – (uncredited)
 Doctor at Sea (1955) – Seaman (uncredited)
 John and Julie (1955) – Taxi Driver
 Secret Venture (1955) – Gymnasium Attendant
 The Ladykillers (1955) – Junk Man (uncredited)
 Lost (1956) – Gamble (uncredited)
 It's Never Too Late (1956) – Removal man (uncredited)
 23 Paces to Baker Street (1956) – Taxi Driver (uncredited)
 The Long Arm (1956) – Barman (uncredited)
 Reach for the Sky (1956) – Lorry Driver (uncredited)
 Sailor Beware! (1956) – Taxi Driver
 Dry Rot (1956) – Bookie
 Up in the World (1956) – Steve (uncredited)
 You Pay Your Money (1957) – Fred (Driver)
 Just My Luck (1957) – Alfie (uncredited)
 Barnacle Bill (1957) – Bus Driver
 Morning Call (film) (1957)- (Taxi Driver) (uncredited) (US: 'The Strange Case of Dr. Manning'):- Republic Pictures release 
 Dunkirk (1958) – Old Sweat
 Next to No Time (1958) – Customer
 A Cry from the Streets (1958) – Mr. Hodges
 The Horse's Mouth (1958) – (uncredited)
 The Square Peg (1958) – Lorry Driver (uncredited)
 The Captain's Table (1959) – Plumber (uncredited)
 No Trees in the Street (1959) – Street Orator
 Carry On Nurse (1959) – Second Ambulance Man
 Left Right and Centre (1959) – Billingsgate Porter (uncredited)
 I'm All Right Jack (1959) – Charlie
 Jungle Street (1960) – Dealer
 The Battle of the Sexes (1960) – 1st Porter
 Light Up the Sky! (1960) – Mr. Jennings
 Doctor in Love (1960) – Ambulance Driver (uncredited)
 There Was a Crooked Man (1960) – Taxi Driver
 No Love for Johnnie (1961) – Taxi Driver (uncredited)
 Carry On Regardless (1961) – Taxi Driver
 Over the Odds (1961) – Fruit Vendor
 Play It Cool (1962) – Skinner's Cab Driver (uncredited)
 The War Lover (1962) – Taxi Driver (uncredited)
 On the Beat (1962) – Cabbie (uncredited)
 Heavens Above! (1963) – Angry Man in Crowd Scene (uncredited)
 Murder at the Gallop (1963) – Fred – Deliveryman (uncredited)
 Ladies Who Do (1963) – Fred (uncredited)
 A Stitch in Time (1963) – Lorry Driver (uncredited)
 The Party's Over (1965) – Taxi Driver (uncredited)
 The Big Job (1965) – Dustman
 The Early Bird (1965) – Man Who Gets in Lift (uncredited)
 To Sir, with Love (1967) – Mr. Clark
 Billion Dollar Brain (1967) – Taxi Driver
 Carry On Loving (1970) – Taxi Driver
 Perfect Friday (1970) – Taxi Driver
 Dad's Army (1971) – Bert King
 Steptoe and Son (1972) – Barman
 Up the Chastity Belt (1972) – Father
 No Sex Please, We're British (1973) – Delivery Man
 Love Thy Neighbour (1973) – Taxi Driver
 The Over-Amorous Artist (1974) – Window Cleaner

References

External links
 

1912 births
1994 deaths
English male film actors
English male television actors
People from Ludlow
Actors from Shropshire